This is a list of typical Gyeongsang dishes found in Korean cuisine.

Main dishes
Heotjesabap (헛제사밥), literally "fake jesa food"
Jinju bibimbap (진주비빔밥), literally "mixed rice of Jinju"
Tongyeong bibimbap (통영비빔밥), literally "mixed rice of Tongyeong"
Mubap (무밥), made with rice and radish
Gaengsik (갱식)
Aehobokjuk (애호박죽) zucchini porridge
Tteokguk (떡국), rice cake made with garaetteok

Noodles
Milmyeon (밀면, 밀국수냉면), cold noodle soup made with wheat flour
Dak kalguksu (닭칼국수), hot noodle soup made with chicken
Geonjin guksu (건진국수)
Jogae guksu (조개국수), hot noodle soup made with clams

Challyu

Soups and stews
Jaecheopguk (재첩국)
Gyesamtang (계삼탕)
Godongguk (고동국)
Chueotang (추어탕)
Seonjitguk (선짓국)
Dongtae gomyeong jijim (동태고명지짐)
Bugeo miyeokguk (북어미역국)
Deulkkae chamkkae miyeokguk (들깨참깨미역국)
Mareunhonghap miyeokguk (마른홍합미역국)

Steamed dishes
Andong jjimdak (찜닭)
Ureong jjim (우렁찜)
Dadatge jjim (바닷게찜)
Mideodeok jjim (미더덕찜)
Agujjim (아구찜)
Hobakseon (호박선)

Braised and stir-fried dishes
Jangeo jorim (장어조림)
Haemul japchae (해물잡채)

Gui
Ojingeo bulgogi (오징어불고기)
Sangeo dombaegi gui (상어돔배기구이)
Galchi gui (갈치구이)
Cheongeo gui (청어구이)
Gaetjangeo gui (갯장어구이)
Yugwak (유곽)

Pancakes
Sangeo dombaegi jeon (상어돔배기전)
Baechujeok (배추적)
Gimbuchigae (김부치개)
Pajeon (파전)

Hoe
Haepari hoe (해파리회)
Pijogae hoe (피조개회)
Gwangeo hoe (광어회)
Meongge hoe (멍게회)
Jangeo hoe (장어회)
Ureong hoe (우렁회)
Saengmyeolchi hoe (생멸치회)
Ingeo hoe (잉어회)

Dried fish
Salted Mackerel (간고등어)
Yakdaegupo (약대구포)
Bungeopo (붕어포)

Vegetables
Mareun muneossam (마른문어쌈
Siraegi doenjang muchim (시래기된장무침)
Sangchu geotjeori (상추겉절이)
Kkoltugi musaengchae (꼴뚜기무생채)
Totnamul (톳나물)
Dubu saengchae (두부생채)
Cheonggak muchim (청각무침)
Dotnamul muchim (돋나물무침)

Kimchi
Putmaneul geotjeori (풋마늘겉절이)
Sokkeumbaechu geotjeori (솎음배추겉절이)
Baechu ssam (배추쌈)
Jeonbok kimchi (전복김치)
Sokse kimchi (속세 김치)
Kongnip kimchi (콩잎김치)
Ueong kimchi (우엉김치)
Buchu kimchi (부추김치)
Ueongnip jaban (우엉잎자반)

Fried dishes
Gochu bugak (고추부각)
Gamja bugak (감자부각)
Kkolttugi twigim (꼴뚜기튀김)
Memilmuk (메밀묵)

Rice cakes
Mosiip songpyeon (모시잎송편)
Mitbiji (밀비지)
Mangyeong tteok (만경떡)
Ssukgullae (쑥굴래)
Japgwapyeon (잡과편)
Jatguri (잣구리)
Bupyeon (부편)
Gamja songpyeon (감자송편)
Chiktteok (칡떡)
Seolgi tteok (설기떡)
Pyeon tteok (편떡)
Gyeongdan (경단)

Dessert

Hangwa
Yugwa (유과)
Jujugangban (준주강반)
Daechu jingjo (대추징조)
Gangnaengi yeot (강냉이엿)
Ueong jeonggwa (우엉정과)
Dasima jeonggwa (다시마정과)
Gaksaek jeonggwa (각색정과)

Non-alcoholic beverages
Dansul (단술)
Sujeonggwa (수정과)
Yuja-hwachae (유자화채)
Yuja-cha (유자차)
Eureum-subak (얼음수박)
Japgok-misutgaru (잡곡미숫가루)
Mul-sikhye (물식혜)
Chapssal-sikhye (찹쌀식혜)
Andong-sikhye (안동식혜)

See also
Korean cuisine
Korean royal court cuisine
Korean temple cuisine
List of Korean dishes

References

External links
Official site of Korea National Tourism List of Korean Food
Food in Korea at the Korea Agro-Fisheries Trade Corporation

Gyeongsang
Gyeongsan